Aldo Oviglio (1873–1942) was an Italian lawyer and politician. Being a member of the National Fascist Party he was the minister of justice in the period October 1922–January 1925, being the first Fascist to hold this post in Italy.

Early life and education
Oviglio was born in Rimini on 7 December 1873. His parent were Francesco and Ida Malvolti. He attended the University of Padua, but did not complete his studies there. He graduated from the University of Bologna obtaining a law degree.

Career and activities
Oviglio joined the Radical Party during his studies at the University of Bologna. He was one of the contributors of a conservative newspaper entitled L'Adigetto. In 1909 he became a member of the masonic lodge in Bologna. He was one of the founders of Giornale deliorno of which the first issue appeared in Bologna on 11 December 1910. He was the president of the provincial council in Bologna between 10 August 1910 and 14 December 1913. 

Oviglio was elected to the city council of Bologna in 1920. He was elected as a deputy from Bologna in 1921 on the list of the National Bloc, serving in the post in the 26th and 27th legislatures. He was appointed minister of justice on 31 October 1922 to the first cabinet of Benito Mussolini. Through the passing of a law dated 3 May 1923 Oviglio managed to dismiss the chief judge and the general attorney of the Supreme Court. 

Oviglio's other significant posts included the member of the Grand Council of Fascism from April 1923 to December 1924 and the president of the provincial council of Bologna from March 1923 to October 1928. Oviglio's term as minister of justice ended on 5 January 1925 when he resigned from the office due to the assassination of Giacomo Matteotti. Oviglio was expelled from the National Fascist Party in August 1925, but he later returned to the party in August 1928. He became a senator on 24 January 1929.

Personal life and death
Oviglio was married to Ida Marzolini. Their son, Galeazzo, died in World War I. He died in Ronerio near Bologna on 19 August 1942.

Awards
Oviglio was the recipient of the following:
 Grand Officer of the Order of the Crown of Italy (17 December 1922)
Grand Cordon of the Order of the Crown of Italy (30 December 1923)
  Grand Officer of the Order of Saints Maurizio and Lazzaro (7 June 1923)

References

External links

20th-century Italian journalists
1873 births
1942 deaths
Members of the Grand Council of Fascism
Italian male journalists
Italian Ministers of Justice
National Fascist Party politicians
People from Rimini
Politicians from Bologna
University of Bologna alumni
Italian Freemasons
Italian Radical Party politicians
Italian newspaper founders
Members of the Senate of the Kingdom of Italy
Deputies of Legislature XXVI of the Kingdom of Italy
Deputies of Legislature XXVII of the Kingdom of Italy
Grand Officers of the Order of Saints Maurice and Lazarus
20th-century Italian lawyers